Stevrek Ridge (‘Hrebet Stevrek’ \'hre-bet 'stev-rek\) is the narrow rocky ridge extending 29.9 km from the southwest part of Arkovna Ridge to the west to Radovene Point to the east, 4.1 km wide, and rising at its west extremity to 1711 m in northern Aristotle Mountains on Oscar II Coast in Graham Land.  It surmounts Mapple Glacier to the north, Sexaginta Prista Bay and Domlyan Bay to the east, and Melville Glacier to the south.  The feature is named after the settlement of Stevrek in Northeastern Bulgaria.

Location
British mapping in 1976.

Maps
 British Antarctic Territory.  Scale 1:200000 topographic map.  DOS 610 Series, Sheet W 65 62.  Directorate of Overseas Surveys, Tolworth, UK, 1976.
 Antarctic Digital Database (ADD). Scale 1:250000 topographic map of Antarctica. Scientific Committee on Antarctic Research (SCAR), 1993–2016.

Notes

References
 Stevrek Ridge. SCAR Composite Antarctic Gazetteer.
 Bulgarian Antarctic Gazetteer. Antarctic Place-names Commission. (details in Bulgarian, basic data in English)

External links
 Stevrek Ridge. Copernix satellite image

Ridges of Graham Land
Oscar II Coast
Bulgaria and the Antarctic